No Regrets is the fourth album by the American pop group The Walker Brothers. The album was released in 1975 and was the group's first together since 1967. It reached number forty-nine on the UK Albums Chart and includes the single "No Regrets". The single backed with the non-album B-side "Remember Me" became the group's final significant hit single, reaching #7 in the UK Singles Chart in early 1976.

The album was significantly different from the group's 1960s work. While the arrangements were still grandiose and often utilised an orchestra, the general musical styles were Country and Pop music. The album was also their first not to include original compositions by either Scott Walker or John Walker. John Walker's only new song "Remember Me" was included as the B-side to "No Regrets". The group's following album Lines did include a lone John Walker composition under a pseudonym, Scott however, would not contribute new songs until 1978's Nite Flights. No Regrets and Lines instead feature cover versions from a variety of contemporary songwriters.

Reception
No Regrets received mixed reviews from the majority of critics. Dave Thompson writing retrospectively for Allmusic praised the title track calling it "brilliant" and "a gargantuan slab of maudlin sadness that wrung every last iota of pain from Scott's voice". Thompson criticised the rest of the album saying it "stunk", but did praise "He'll Break Your Heart" and "Burn Our Bridges".

Track listing

Personnel

 John Walker, Judd Proctor, Len Walker, Scott Walker - acoustic guitar
 Alan Parker - acoustic and electric guitar
 Bones (Suzanne Lynch, Brigette du Doit, Janice Slater, Joy Yates) - backing vocals
 Daryl Runswick - bass 
 Steve Gray - acoustic piano, string arrangements, conductor
 Barry Morgan - drums
 Dougie Wright - drums, percussion
 Ritchy Hitchcock - electric guitar
 B.J. Cole - pedal steel
 David Katz Orchestra - orchestra
 Chris Karan, Gary Walker - percussion
 Dave MacRae - electric piano
Technical
 Phil Harding - engineer
 Michael Joseph - photography

Charts

Release details

References 

1975 albums
The Walker Brothers albums
GTO Records albums